Macon Blair (born 1974) is an American actor, screenwriter, director, film producer, and comic book writer known for his roles in the films Blue Ruin and Green Room, as well as his directorial debut I Don't Feel at Home in This World Anymore.

Life and career
Blair was born in Alexandria, Virginia and began working with his childhood friend Jeremy Saulnier in 2007 on the film Murder Party. In 2013, he played Dwight Evans in the critically acclaimed film Blue Ruin. In 2015, he starred in Saulnier's film Green Room.

Blair co-wrote and starred in the dark comedy Small Crimes starring Nikolaj Coster-Waldau. Blair made his directorial debut on I Don't Feel At Home in This World Anymore. It had its world premiere at the 2017 Sundance Film Festival and won that festival's Grand Jury Prize. It was released on February 24, 2017, by Netflix.

On March 24, 2019, it was announced that Blair would write and direct a Toxic Avenger reboot for Legendary Pictures.

He is married to actress Lee Eddy. Together they have a son, Buck (b. 2015).

Filmography

Film

Producer

Acting roles

Television

Acting roles

References

External links 
 

American film producers
American film editors
American male screenwriters
Living people
Male actors from Alexandria, Virginia
1974 births
Film directors from Virginia
Screenwriters from Virginia
21st-century American male actors
21st-century American male writers
21st-century American screenwriters
Writers from Alexandria, Virginia